Grange Park may refer to:

Canada
 Grange Park (Toronto), a public park from the estate of the Grange
 Grange Park (neighbourhood), the neighbourhood surrounding the park

United Kingdom
Grange Park, Blackpool
Grange Park, Enfield
Grange Park railway station
Kilburn Grange Park
Grange Park, Northamptonshire
Grange Park Opera, based at West Horsley Place, Surrey 
Grange Park, Wetherby, a multi-purpose sports ground

United States
La Grange Park, Illinois